Shmulik Perlman (23 May 1926 – 24 September 2003) was an Israeli football player and manager.

Career
Perlman was born in Tel Aviv in 1926, he began his career in the youth ranks of Maccabi Ramat Gan. At the age of 14 he moved to Maccabi Netanya, Netanya paid Ramat Gan a transfer fee of £P30. He began playing for the senior side at the age of 16 and on 25 March 1944 scored his first goal in the first division, in a 0-2 victory over Maccabi Petah Tikva. Perelman played with Netanya in the State cup finals of 1954 against Maccabi Tel Aviv. His last game was on January 18, 1958, in a game where his team lost to Maccabi Tel Aviv 3-1 in the league.

After retiring as a player, Perlman started his coaching career. After one season with Hapoel Even Yehuda he was appointed the youth coach of Maccabi Netanya. He remained with Netanya until 1968. In 1968, he coached the national youth team for one year and later on worked as the coach of Hapoel Hadera and Maccabi Herzliya. In 1971, he came back to work as the youth coach of Maccabi Netanya and four years later he became the coach of the senior side. In the 1977-78 season Perlman led the club to its finest hour as the club won all the titles in Israeli football as well as their group in the UEFA Intertoto Cup.

After his first term in Netanya, Perlman worked in such clubs as Hapoel Haifa and Maccabi Jaffa. He returned to coach Maccabi Netanya in the 1981-82 season, the season was highly successful yet Netanya finished only as the league runners-up, as they lost the title to Hapoel Kfar Saba by one point.

From 1983 to 1985 Perlman worked as the coach of the Israel national under-19 football team. After two years with the national under-19 he bounced around with a few clubs from the Liga Leumit and Liga Artzit. During the 1992-93 he was appointed coach of Maccabi Netanya again, and the following season led the team to sixth place in the table. Perelman did not go on for another season, but six games to the end of the 1994-95 season he returned. He wasn't able to keep the club in the league, and Netanya dropped to the second division. 
After this season Perelman did not return to coach again.

Managerial stats with Maccabi Netanya

Honours

As a player
 State Cup
 Runner-up (1): 1954

As a manager
 Championships
 Winner (1): 1977–78
 Runner-up (1): 1981–82
 State Cup
 Winner (1): 1978
 Israeli Supercup
 Winner (1): 1978
 UEFA Intertoto Cup
 Winner (1): 1978

References

1926 births
2003 deaths
Israeli Jews
Israeli footballers
Maccabi Netanya F.C. players
Israeli football managers
Hapoel Hadera F.C. managers
Maccabi Herzliya F.C. managers
Maccabi Netanya F.C. managers
Hapoel Haifa F.C. managers
Maccabi Jaffa F.C. managers
Hakoah Ramat Gan F.C. managers
Footballers from Tel Aviv
Association footballers not categorized by position